Félix Bódog Widder (28 April 1874 – 26 September 1939) was a Hungarian painter, graphic designer and teacher.

Biography and carrier

Félix Bódog Widder was born on 28 April 1874 in Arad. His daughter was Magda Widder, the wife of poet Béla Vihar and the mother of Judit Vihar.
He studied in Paris and Munich. He was an impressionist painter. He made the paint by hand for his paintings.

References

Gallery

Bibliography

External links 

 

1874 births
Hungarian painters
Hungarian graphic designers
1939 deaths
People from Arad, Romania